Lwazilubanzi Mthembu (born 11 July 1991), popularly known as Lwazi Mthembu, is a South African actress, dancer and singer. She is best known for the roles in the television serials, Thandeka's Diary, Broken Vows and House of Zwide.

Personal life
Mthembu was born on 11 July 1991 in South Africa. She completed high school at the Sacred Heart College. In 2010, she enrolled to a BA degree in Performing Arts at the University of the Witwatersrand where she graduated in 2013.

Career
During her university life, she performed in many theatre plays such as; Aqua Mine directed by Gys de Villiers, Once Upon a Life at the Wits Theatre and By the Apricot Trees directed by Ntsako Mkhabela for the Grahamstown Festival of the Arts. In 2013, she made television debut with the SABC1 anthology drama serial Intersexions, where she played a supportive role of "nurse". After graduation, he joined with the fifth season of the e.tv anthology series eKasi: Our Stories and the played the role "Lala". Then in 2014, she made a guest role in the e.tv romantic comedy-drama serial Mzansi Love.

In 2015 she made a lead role "Sihle" in the SABC1 television sitcom Thandeka's diary. The role became very popular where she played the role in three seasons until 2019. In 2016, she was invited to play the role "Nurse" in final episodes of the Mzansi Magic soap opera Zabalaza. In 2021, she joined with the cast of television serial House of Zwide with the role "Nomsa".

Apart from acting, she is also a singer and is the vocalist for the band, "About That Life".

Filmography

References

External links
 IMDb

Living people
South African television actresses
South African stage actresses
1991 births